Malnad Gladiators is a Shimoga based Karnataka Premier League franchise cricket team representing the Malenadu region of Karnataka, India.  The team is led by Cricketer Rajoo Bhatkal.

References

Indian club cricket teams
Sport in Karnataka
Karnataka Premier League